Macit Sonkan (born 1953) is a Turkish actor.

Born in İzmir, Sonkan studied Fine Arts and graduated with a degree in theatre studies. In 1978, he started his career by joining the Turkish State Theatres. Meanwhile, he continued his career in both cinema and television. Sonkan also directed and took part in plays for children. For his career on stage, he won a number of national awards.

Theatre

As actor 
 Aşkımız Aksaray'ın En Büyük Yangını : Güngör Dilmen - Istanbul State Theatre - 2012
 Töre : Turgut Özakman - Istanbul State Theatre - 2009
 The Lower Depths : Maxim Gorky - Istanbul State Theatre - 2003
 Caligula : Albert Camus - Istanbul State Theatre - 2001
 Kamyon : Memet Baydur - Istanbul State Theatre - 1999
 Measure for Measure : William Shakespeare - Istanbul State Theatre - 1998
 Resimli Osmanlı Tarihi : Turgut Özakman - İzmir State Theatre - 1994
 A View from the Bridge : Arthur Miller - İzmir State Theatre - 1989
 Kısmet : Erhan Gökgücü - Bursa State Theatre - 1986

As director 
 Spaghetti mit Ketchup : Rainer Hachfeld - Istanbul State Theatre - 2000

Filmography

Film 
 Melekler ve Kumarbazlar - 2009
 Güneşi Gördüm - 2009
 Avanak Kuzenler - 2008
 Dilberin Sekiz Günü - 2008
 Deli Yürek: Bumerang Cehennemi - 2001
 Abuzer Kadayıf - 2000 
 İnsan Kurdu - 1997
 Acı Ve Tatlı Günler - 1996
 Camdan Kalp - 1990

TV film 
 Bir Aşk Hikayesi - 2004
 Çalınan Ceset - 2004
 Kırık Zar - 2000

TV series 
 Çukur - 2021
 Hercai - 2019–2021
 Alev Alev - 2012
 Aşk Bir Hayal - 2009
 Dede Korkut Hikayeleri - 2007 
 Hasret - 2006 
 Ezo Gelin - 2006 
 Alanya Almanya - 2005 
 Aşkımızda Ölüm Var - 2004 
 Hayalet - 2004 
 Artık Çok Geç - 2000 
 Deli Yürek - 1999
 Yasemince - 1997 
 Tersine Akan Nehir - 1996
 Köşe Kapmaca - 1996 
 Gurbetçiler - 1996 
 Çiçek Taksi - 1995 
 Süper Baba - 1993 
 Ateşten Günler - 1987 
 Dost Eller - 1982

References

External links 
 
 

Turkish male stage actors
Turkish male film actors
Turkish male television actors
Actors from İzmir
1953 births
Living people